"Break Free" is a song by American singer Ariana Grande featuring Russian-German music producer Zedd. Written by Savan Kotecha and its producers Zedd and Max Martin, it premiered on July 2, 2014, on Total Ariana Live, MTV's revival of Total Request Live. The song was made available by digital download later that day and was serviced to contemporary hit and rhythmic radio on July 8, 2014, as the second single from Grande's second studio album My Everything (2014). Musically, the song explores EDM and electro genres, a musical departure for Grande, whose discography is primarily composed of pop and R&B.

"Break Free" peaked at number four on the Billboard Hot 100, becoming Grande's third consecutive top-ten from My Everything after "Problem" and "Bang Bang", and fourth overall in the US. Similarly, "Break Free" hit number three on the Australian ARIA Charts, and number five on the Canadian Hot 100 and the New Zealand Singles Chart. Overall, the song attained top-ten peaks in multiple countries including Austria, Czech Republic, Finland, Ireland, the Netherlands, Norway, Poland, Slovakia, and Sweden, as well as reaching the top twenty in Belgium, Denmark, Germany, Italy, Japan, Poland, Scotland, South Korea, Spain, Switzerland, and the United Kingdom.

The song has been certified triple Platinum by the RIAA and has sold 1.9 million copies in the United States as of 2018, making it Grande's seventh single to have sold over a million. "Break Free" also marked a milestone in Grande's career, as it entered the top ten on the Billboard Hot 100 the same week "Bang Bang" and "Problem" were charting. Consequently, she became the second lead female artist in chart history to simultaneously hold three positions in the top ten on the Hot 100 after Adele.

Production and composition

"Break Free" was written by Savan Kotecha, Zedd and Max Martin and produced by the latter two.
The song was originally intended for a male singer, due to her working on his 2013 single "Say Somethin". In a May 2014 interview during which he talked about "Break Free", Zedd spoke about wanting to collaborate with Grande after hearing her voice for the first time at a Universal showcase. He said, "I was backstage and I heard someone sing. And I didn't know who it was, and I just said 'I want to make a song with whoever is singing right now.' I didn't know who it was, and it turned out to be her. And luckily, now there's a song!" Grande first spoke about collaborating on a song with Zedd in late April in an interview with Billboard. She described the song as "fantastic and super-experimental for me" and further stated, "I never thought I'd do an EDM song, but that was an eye-opening experience, and now all I want to do is dance." She later talked about the song at Wango Tango and shared that she wanted it to be the next single.

According to the sheet music published at Musicnotes.com by Kobalt Music Services America, "Break Free" is written in the key of G minor. Ariana Grande commented on the seemingly nonsensical lyrics, telling Time magazine, "I fought [Max Martin] on it the whole time.  I am not going to sing a grammatically incorrect lyric, help me, God! Max was like, ‘It’s funny — just do it!'"

Release
On May 10, 2014, during an interview after her performance at Wango Tango, Grande revealed that she wanted "Break Free" to be her next single after "Problem". She said, "I did a song with Zedd, who I just met for the first time here, and I'm really excited about that song. I really want that to be the second single. My whole team is like, 'Oh it's too early to pick a new single,' but I'm really leaning towards that one. I love that song so much. He's fantastic and the song is really fun."

Grande began dropping hints about her second single on social media throughout the month of June but did not confirm that it was her Zedd collaboration until June 21, at which point she also revealed the song's name on Twitter. To build hype, Grande started an online countdown for the ten days leading up to "Break Free's" release. On June 28, Grande uploaded a teaser video with a snippet of the song to her Instagram account.

"Break Free" premiered on the one-day revival of the MTV show Total Request Live in a half-hour special titled Total Ariana Live on July 2, 2014. It was made available for purchase as a digital download on iTunes a few hours after the TRL premiere. It reached the number one spot on the iTunes Sales Chart soon after its release.

Critical reception
Rachel Sonis from Idolator gave the song a positive review calling it "the club anthem of the summer" and thought that Grande herself is "dipping her toes into exciting new waters for her upcoming record." Lewis Corner from Digital Spy gave the song four stars out of five and said that the track is "too catchy to be generic". Larry Fitzmaurice from Pitchfork also liked the song praising both the production part of the song and the vocal saying that, "from the zippy opening synth line to the verse's insistent pounding, 'Break Free' certainly invites comparisons to Swedish pop mastermind Robyn; as ever, Grande brings her own skyscraping voice in top form, so vocally the comparisons don't stick." He compared the message of the song to Kelly Clarkson's "Since U Been Gone".

"Break Free" was nominated at the 2014 Teen Choice Awards in the Break-Up Song category. It was also nominated for Top Dance/Electronic Song at the 2015 Billboard Music Awards.

Accolades

Commercial performance
In the United States, "Break Free" debuted at number 15 on the Billboard Hot 100 with 161,000 digital downloads sold in its first week, entering the Digital Songs chart at number five. Following the release of the song's official music video on August 12, "Break Free" soared on the Hot 100 from number 18 to number four, becoming Grande's fourth top-ten single and her third consecutive top-ten single of 2014. Grande's other singles, "Bang Bang" and "Problem" were also in the Billboard Hot 100 top ten that week, placing at number ten and seven respectively. With three songs in the top ten, Ariana Grande became the second female lead artist to have three singles in the top ten since Adele in 2012. In that same week, "Break Free" jumped from 14 to four on the Billboard Digital Songs charts with 116,000 digital downloads sold, along with "Bang Bang" and the promotional single "Best Mistake" (featuring Big Sean) ranking at numbers two and six respectively. Consequently, Grande became the first female artist to have three songs placing in the top six of the Billboard Digital Songs chart simultaneously and the second overall artist since Michael Jackson. This also marked Zedd's second top ten and his highest-peaking single to date in the US. "Break Free" also peaked at number three on the Dance Club Songs, while topping the Dance/Electronic Songs chart for nine weeks, becoming Grande's and Zedd's first number one in the latter. The song has sold 1.9 million copies in the nation as of April 2018.

Internationally, the song also reached the top ten in Australia, Austria, Canada, Finland, Ireland, Netherlands, New Zealand, Poland, and Sweden.

Impact 
In March 2022, "Break Free" has received attention in the Philippines during a campaign rally for presidential candidate, Vice President Leni Robredo and her running mate, Sen. Francis Pangilinan. A video of the crowd singing "Break Free" went viral, catching the attention of Grande herself. Grande posted the video on Instagram, stating "I could not believe this was real. I love you more than words". An estimated 137,000 people attended the rally.

Music video

The music video was filmed from June 10–12, 2014. It was directed by Chris Marrs Piliero. Having an intergalactic theme, Grande stated that the video was inspired by the 1968 sci-fi film Barbarella, the Star Wars series and space in general. The plot consists of Grande on a fictional planet renouncing her allegiance to an evil regime of extraterrestrials and freeing a group of prisoners from their cages. She subsequently attacks a giant robot using missiles, but the robot managed to release its hand to catch her, bringing her to the planet's overlord. Her character succeeds in defeating the villain, and the clip ends with Grande and the prisoners she rescued flying away in a spaceship, partying with the crew, as Beats by Dre products are visible in the scene. The song's producer Zedd makes an appearance.

It premiered on YouTube on August 12, 2014. It surpassed 100 million views on October 5, making it Grande's third Vevo-certified music video after "The Way" and "Problem". It made its televised debut three days later on Disney Channel during its original movie How to Build a Better Boy. As of May 2019, the video has received over 1 billion views on YouTube.

Live performances
Grande first performed at the "IHeartRadio Theater at the L.A Honda Stage" on August 22, 2014. She performs the song for the second time at the 31st annual MTV Video Music Awards on August 24, 2014. She then went on to perform it on several television shows, including America's Got Talent on August 27, on Today on August 29, and on The X Factor Australia on September 8. She also performed it at the iHeartRadio Music Festival on September 19. She performed a half acoustic, half upbeat version of "Break Free" on Saturday Night Live on September 27, 2014. Grande once again performed "Break Free" at the 2014 MTV Europe Music Awards on November 9, 2014, opening up the show along with her other single "Problem". Grande performed the song at the American Music Awards on November 23, 2014. "Break Free" was part of Grande's set list for the Honeymoon Tour, the Dangerous Woman Tour and One Love Manchester, a benefit concert held on June 4, 2017, for the victims of the Manchester Arena bombing.

The song was also performed at Grande's Sweetener World Tour on all dates from March 18 to November 22, 2019, before it was removed.

Credits and personnel
Credits adapted from My Everything liner notes.

Recording and management
 Recorded at Conway Recording Studios (Los Angeles, California) and Zedd1 Studio (Santa Monica, California)
 Mastered at Sterling Sound (New York City, New York)
 Zedd Music Empire (ASCAP), all rights administered by Kobalt Songs Music Publishing, MXM (administered by Kobalt) (ASCAP), MXM (administered by Kobalt (ASCAP)

Personnel

 Ariana Grande – lead vocals, background vocals
 Zedd – songwriting, production, programming, instruments, mixing
 Max Martin – songwriting, production for MXM Productions
 Savan Kotecha – songwriting
 Ryan Shanahan – engineering
 Jesse Taub – engineering
 Sam Holland – engineering
 Cory Bice – engineering
 Tom Coyne – mastering
 Aya Merrill – mastering

Other versions
For its sixth season, the hit musical-comedy TV series Glee covered this song in the ninth episode titled "Child Star". This version is performed by Lea Michele, Josie Totah, Dot-Marie Jones, Jane Lynch, Matthew Morrison, and Chord Overstreet as their characters Rachel Berry, Myron Muskovitz, Sheldon Beiste, Sue Sylvester, Will Schuester, and Sam Evans, respectively. A small portion of the lyrics is changed for an unknown reason.

Fantasy-comedy series The Good Place uses the original recording of this song as background music for a sequence in its series premiere "Everything Is Fine".

Reese Witherspoon and Nick Kroll performed this in the 2021 animated feature Sing 2 as Rosita and Gunther.

Dakota Lotus, Olivia Sanabia and Ruby Rose Turner sing a portion of the song in a 2020 episode of Coop & Cami Ask the World in their respective roles as Coop, Charlotte and Cami, after Ariana Grande fails to show up at Cami's birthday party. The episode aired during the COVID-19 pandemic.

Charts

Weekly charts

Year-end charts

Decade-end charts

Certifications and sales

Release history

References

2014 singles
2014 songs
Ariana Grande songs
Republic Records singles
Zedd songs
Electronic dance music songs
Song recordings produced by Max Martin
Songs written by Max Martin
Songs written by Savan Kotecha
Songs written by Zedd
Music videos directed by Chris Marrs Piliero
Extraterrestrial life in popular culture
Songs with feminist themes
Synth-pop songs
American synth-pop songs
American electronic songs
American dance-pop songs
Dance-pop songs